Bayt Kahin is a village in Bani Matar District of Sanaa Governorate, Yemen. It is located to the east of Jabal an-Nabi Shu'ayb.

History 
The earliest known mention of Bayt Kahin in historical sources is in 1618 (1027 AH), in the Ghayat al-amani of Yahya ibn al-Husayn.

References 

Villages in Sanaa Governorate